Andong is a city in South Korea, and the capital of North Gyeongsang Province. It is the largest city in the northern part of the province with a population of 167,821 as of October 2010. The Nakdong River flows through the city. Andong is a market centre for the surrounding agricultural areas.

Since the 1970s Andong has developed rapidly, although the population has fallen by nearly seventy thousand as people have moved away to Seoul, Busan, Daegu and other urban centres. In the late 1990s and early 2000s it became a tourism and cultural center.

Andong is known as a centre of culture and folk traditions. The surrounding area maintains many types of traditions and the Andong Folk Festival is held in mid October every year. One of the most famous aspects of these cultural festivities are the Andong masks.

Andong National University, specialising in education and Korean folklore, has grown rapidly since the 1970s. Other tertiary institutions include Andong Science College and Catholic Sangji College.

History

Around 1 BC, Andong was founded by the Jinhan people, and it was known as Gochang. During the Three Kingdoms period, the area was controlled by the Silla kingdom. The Battle of Gochang in 930 was fought here between Hubaekje forces and the Goryeo army led by Wanggeon, who won control of the city and renamed it Andong.

After the ascent of the Joseon dynasty to the throne of Korea, Andong became a centre of Confucianism. The area was extremely conservative for a long time and produced many leading confucian scholars. Toe-gye Yi Hwang (1501–70), one of the most prominent of all Korean scholars, came from Andong. Yi Hwang retired back to his homeland late in life and started the establishment of the great Confucian academy Dosan Seowon there, which was finished after his death. During this period Andong and its principal families were influential within Korean political circles, of which the three notable families were the Andong Kim, Andong Jang and Andong Kwon clans.

After the 16th century Andong became less influential until the early 19th century, when a marriage of the local Kim family resulted in strong influence on the royal family.

Andong was the site of intense fighting during the Korean War in the early 1950s, the Battle of Andong. Although the city was almost destroyed, it was quickly rebuilt. In 1976 the Andong Dam was built, providing the city with a reliable source of electricity.

In 1999, Her Majesty the Queen Elizabeth II of the United Kingdom celebrated her 73rd birthday in the city. There is an exhibit dedicated to this historic visit at Hahoe folk village museum. Andong soju is made using traditional methods that are centuries old unlike its popular modern counterparts.  It is protected by government regulation to preserve authenticity and commands a steep premium in the marketplace.

Administrative divisions 

Andong is divided into 1 eup, 13 myeon and 10 dong. The following is a list of eup, myeon and dong:

Local specialty foods

Andong has famous local foods that originated in the city such as heotjesabap, Andong jjimdak, Andong soju (a rice wine), Andong sikhye (a punch), Geonjin guksu (a noodle dish), and salted mackerel.

Heotjesabap is a variety of bibimbap, served with soy sauce (ganjang) instead of the gochujang (hot pepper paste) that is more commonly used. Heotjesa bab consists mainly of several types of namul (young sprouted vegetables) over white rice. It is also served with grilled fish, shark, and jeon (Korean pancake). The dish originated in Andong. The term, Heotjesa bap literally means "dishes for fake jesa" that are ceremonies for death anniversary and ancestor veneration held in Korea. The reason it is considered fake is that it is not covered in incense ash, as would happen to any food sacrificed in a jesa ritual.

Andong jjimdak is a variety of jjim (a Korean steamed or braised dish), made with chicken, cellophane noodles, and various vegetables marinated in a ganjang (Korean soy sauce) based sauce. The name literally means "steamed chicken of Andong." There are many speculations on the origins of the dish. One is that the it is a specialty food of the inner rich village of Andong during the Joseon period, prepared and eaten for special occasions. The more likely explanation is that during the 1980s in the Dak golmok (literally "chicken alley") of the "Andong Old Market," restaurant owners there made a dish including ingredients that regulars demanded, which became the current Andong jjimdak. Restaurateurs in the area claim it was invented by five local old women who had limited chicken supplies and wanted to stretch it out. The most plausible speculation among existing assumptions is that merchants of the Dak golmok at the market created the dish to keep their position against the rapid expansion of Western fried chicken shops.

Andong Soju is a specialty of the region. It is made with natural ingredients, unlike mass-produced brands, it was historically used for medicinal purposes, and was developed during the Silla dynasty. The traditions of Andong Soju were almost lost during the '60s and '70s due to government legislation, but they were brought back by Cho Ok-hwa, the current skillholder. Andong soju was traditionally made by the wife of a household, and she passed down the secrets to her daughters-in-law.

Mackerel is another popular local delicacy. Caught downstream where the Nakdong River meets the sea, in ancient times the fish would spoil before being brought further inland. Using special salting techniques, Andong was the furthest inland the fish could be brought, so aristocrats would travel to Andong specially for the salted fish.

Sikhye is a fermented rice punch served across Korea. The Andong variety, however, is particularly spicy, made with powdered red pepper, ginger, and radish. Sikhye contains lactobacillus, a benign strain of bacteria found in the gastrointestinal tract, and often used as a digestive aid in dishes including kimchi, yogurt, and sauerkraut, among others.

Culture

Museums 

 Andong Soju and Traditional Food Museum
 Gyeongsangbuk-do Forest Science Museum
 Kwon Jeong Saeng Fairy Tale Museum
 Municipal Folk Museum
 Seonseonghyun Cultural Heritage Complex
 Traditional Cultural Contents Museum

Parks 

 Gyemyeongsan Recreation Forest
 Amsan Pleasure Ground

Villages 

 Andong Gunja Village
 Yeumteo Village
 Jirye Arts Village
 Hahoe Folk Village

Confuncian Academies 

 Dosan Seowon
 Byeongsan Seowon
 Imcheon Seowon
 Gosan Seowon

Mountains 

 Gallasan Mountain
 Cheondeungsan Mountain

Monuments 

 Gyeongsangbuk-do Independence Movement Memorial

Experiences 

 Dosan Hot Spring
 Andong Maskdance Festival
Hahoe Mask Dance. 
 Hakgasan Hot Spring
 Top-bliss Golf Club
 Imhaho Camping Water Leisure Town
 HuGreen Golf Club
 Danho Sand Park Camping Site
 Danho Sand Park Camping Site
 HuGreen Golf Club
 Top-bliss Golf Club
 Ontrepieum

Architecture

Historical 

 Bongjeongsa, a Buddhist monastery
 Nongam Jongtaek
 Andong imcheonggak
 Taesamyo
 Confucian Land

Modern 

 Gyeongbuk Provincial Government Office

Education 

 Andong Manner School
 Advanced Center for Korean Studies

Sports 

 Andong Gymnasium

Visitor attractions in Andong
The Hahoe Folk Village is perhaps the most notable folk village in South Korea. This village is listed by the South Korean government with UNESCO as a World Heritage site with Yangdong Folk Village in 2010.

Andong is also a home of Confucian studies and academies during the Joseon Dynasty. The notable examples of seowon, or Confucian academy are Dosan Seowon that enshrines Yi Hwang, Byeongsan Seowon for Yu Seong-ryong, Imcheon Seowon for Kim Seong-il, Gosan Seowon, Hwacheon Seowon and others. Other notable visitor destinations are Sisadan, Jirye Artists' Colony, Bongjeongsa temple and Andong Icheondong Seokbulsang aka Jebiwon Stone Buddha.

Andong also has Andong Dam. In the area where Andong Dam is located, there is a monument to the Andong Samil Movement to honor the March 1st Movement. In addition, there are Wonmom theme parks and Unbu parks.

Festival 

 Andong International Mask Dance Festival

Climate
Andong has a humid continental climate (Köppen: Dwa), but can be considered a borderline humid subtropical climate (Köppen: Cwa) using the  isotherm. The city is located in the mountainous region of central South Korea and is part of the temperate climate. Temperatures vary widely, fog is high at 79 days per year, seasonal winds are northwest in winter and northwest in summer.

Gallery

Sister cities

 Bacolod, Negros Occidental, Philippines
 Sagae, Yamagata Prefecture, Japan
 

Partnership of kindness with:

People from Andong

Cho Yoon-jeong (born 1979), tennis player
Ji Han-jae (born 1936), martial artist, Hapkido grandmaster and actor
Lee Elijah (born 1990), actress
Lee Jae-myung (born 1964), Governor of Gyeonggi Province
Kim Jin-kyu (1922–1998), actor, film director and producer
Kim Jong-gil (1926–2017), poet
Kim Mi-soon, Paralympic archer
Park Ki-woong (born 1985), actor
Park So-yeon (born 1987), singer, actress and K-pop idol (T-ara)
Kim "Canna" Chang-dong (born 2000), professional League of Legends player, currently a top laner for DWG KIA.
 Lee Dong-heon (born 1995), singer and K-pop idol (VERIVERY)

See also
Geography of South Korea
List of cities in South Korea

External links

City government website
Andong : Official Site of Korea Tourism Org

References

 
Cities in North Gyeongsang Province